It's Always Late for Freedom is a 2008 Iranian documentary directed by Mehrdad Oskouei. The film depicts the life of three teenager boys in Tehran House of Correction. They are portrayed as victims of serious social problems such as addiction, poverty and divorce, which the Iranian society is faced with.

Festivals and awards 
 9th Thessaloniki International Film Festival, March 16 to 25, 2007, Greece 
 3rd Ukrainian International Documentary Film Festival, 2007, Kiev, Ukraine
Special Jury Diploma
 Vision du Reel International Documentary Film Festival, 2007, Nyon, Switzerland
 2nd Iranian Film Festival, 2007, Utrecht, Netherland
 5th Lisbon International Documentary Film Festival, 2007, Lisbon, Portugal
 50th International Leipzig Documentary and Animated Film Festival, 2007, Leipzig, Germany
 10th Les Rencontres Internationals du documentaries DE, 2007, Montreal, Canada
 Courmayeur Noir in Festival, 2007, Rome, Italy
 7th International Film Festival Watch Documentaries, 2007, Warsaw, Poland
Nominated of The Best Mid-Length Award
 4th Tri Continental Film Festival, 2008, New Delhi, India
 7th Doc Point – Helsinki Documentary Film Festival, 2008, Helsinki, Finland
 Festival Black Movie, February 1 to 10, 2008, Switzerland
 Hot Docs Int’l Documentary Film Festival, 2008, Toronto, Canada
 Fifth Golden Apricot International Film Festival, Yerevan Int’l Film Festival July 13 to 20, 2008, Yerevan, Armenia
 Argenmex Film Festival, 18 to 26 Oct 2008, Mexico
 1th Fida Doc'souss - International Documentary Film Festival in Aghadir, Morocco, 2008
 15th Int’l Documentary Sheffield film Festival, 2008, Sheffield, UK
 Nominated of John Grierson Award
 Med Int’l Film Festival, 2008, Rome, Italy
 Museum of Fine Arts (MFA), Boston, 2008, Boston, USA
 CNEX Int’l Film Festival, 2008, Beijing, China and Taiwan
 8th Festival du Film Amazigh, 2009, Siddi bel abbas
 Int’l Children's Film Festival (CMS), 2009, India
 6th Planet Documentary Review Film Festival, 2009, Warsaw, Poland
 School of Oriental and African Studies (University of London/ SOAS), 2009, UK 
 The Rendezvous With Madness Film Festival, 2009, Toronto, Canada
 Middle East Now Int’l Film Festival, 2012, Florence, Italy
 ”Retrospective of Mehrdad Oskouei’s films, Images Cinema, 2011, Williamston, USA
 Bill Cosford Cinema at the University of Miami, 2011, Miami, USA
 “Retrospective of Mehrdad Oskouei”, DAS IRANISCHE WIEN, Filmarchiv Austria, 2012, Vienna, Austria
 Special Jury Award* at the 3rd Ukrainian Int'l Documentary Film Festival, 2007, Ukraine
 Runner of Trophy* at the TRI Continental Film Festival, 2008, New Delhi, India
 The Best Mid-Length Documentary Award* at the Hot Docs Int’l Documentary Film Festival, 2008, Toronto, Canada
 Special Jury Award* at the Med Int’l Film Festival, 2008, Rome, Italy
 Mention of the Jury* at the 6th Planet Documentary Review Film Festival, 2009, Warsaw, Poland

Film reviews 
 The film expresses the obvious and fundamentally negative aspects of juvenile incarceration
By Omid Tofighian

It's Always Late for Freedom is a film about the most sensitive moments associated with transition and the most potent emotions it evokes. The film is about a ‘rite of passage’ or, more accurately, a ‘baptism of fire’ that three children are initiated through. On a more theoretical level, the film can also be interpreted as a simile expressing the trials and tribulations of societies or nations during the course of progress.

Mehrdad Oskouei's documentary must not simply be seen as only a tale about the lives of children in a juvenile detention centre. It is also a reflection of some of the most compelling problems faced by individuals as they struggle toward maturity and the strongest emotions felt as they grapple with social and personal evolution. Stages of development and their corresponding emotions are depicted through the experiences of Oskouei's three protagonists, Vahid, Ali and Sajad. By describing the ordeal of three boys in a house of correction he is simultaneously prescribing possibilities for instilling hope; gaining knowledge through feelings of regret; and understanding the significance of innocence in the face of injustice.

References

External links
 

Iranian documentary films